23 Paces to Baker Street is a 1956 American DeLuxe Color mystery thriller film directed by Henry Hathaway. It was released by 20th Century Fox and filmed in Cinemascope on location in London. The screenplay by Nigel Balchin was based on the 1938 novel Warrant for X, original UK title The Nursemaid Who Disappeared by Philip MacDonald. The film focuses on Philip Hannon (Van Johnson), a blind playwright who overhears a partial conversation he believes is related to the planning of a kidnapping. When the authorities fail to take action because they believe his story is the product of a writer's fertile imagination, Hannon searches for the child with the help of his butler and ex-fiancée, using his acute sense of hearing to gather evidence and serve as guidance. The plot of the film bears some resemblance to Alfred Hitchcock's Rear Window of 1954, which also features a disabled protagonist witnessing a crime, which the police refuse to take seriously, therefore placing him in danger and culminating in a final standoff with the killer in the protagonist's darkened apartment.

Plot
Philip Hannon is a blind man who lives in a London flat with a spectacular view over the Thames river between Waterloo Bridge and Charing Cross Station, with his trusted butler Bob Matthews; he works as a playwright. One day, he overhears part of a conversation in his local pub that possibly involves a plot to commit a crime. He tries to contact Inspector Grovening who offers no help, so he teams up with his butler and his ex-fiancée, Jean, who is over from America, to bring the kidnappers to justice. Their sleuthing soon leads them to a nanny agency with dire repercussions.

Cast

 Van Johnson as Phillip Hannon
 Vera Miles as Jean Lennox
 Cecil Parker as Bob Matthews
 Patricia Laffan as Miss Alice MacDonald 
 Maurice Denham as Inspector Grovening
 Isobel Elsom as Lady Syrett
 Estelle Winwood as Barmaid
 Liam Redmond as Mr. Murch
 Martin Benson as Pillings
 Natalie Norwick as Janet Murch
 Terence De Marney as Sergeant Luce

Reception
In his review in The New York Times, Bosley Crowther observed, "a large part of this picture is curiously casual and slow, as Van Johnson, as the blind man, bores the mischief out of everybody with his hazy suspicions...for that matter, he bores the audience, too. Lots of unimpressed fellows were ho-humming in the balcony at Loew's State yesterday...matters do start popping about half or two-thirds of the way along, when it is finally discovered, through various coincidences, that something has been cooking all the time. But you have to depend on Mr. Johnson — and Nigel Balchin, the screenwriter — to give you the details after they've been discovered. This is not a good way to get people interested in a mystery show...it would be a more exciting picture if it got going with a little more snap, established a more compelling mystery and built up some genuine suspense."

See also
 List of American films of 1956

References

External links

 
 
 
 

1956 films
1950s crime thriller films
1950s mystery thriller films
CinemaScope films
American crime thriller films
American mystery thriller films
1950s English-language films
Films about blind people
Films based on British novels
Films based on thriller novels
Films set in London
20th Century Fox films
Films directed by Henry Hathaway
Films with screenplays by Nigel Balchin
1950s American films